Diego Mendoza, or de Mendoza, might refer to:

Diego Mendoza (born 1992), an Argentine footballer
Diego de Mendoza (1549-1562), an Aztec Empire tlatoani or king
 (died 1533), Spanish captain murdered by mutineer Fortún Ximénez